José María Cabral y Báez (1864–1937) was a lawyer, businessman, and politician from the Dominican Republic. He served as the President of Chamber of Deputies of the Dominican Republic in 1901.

Early life and family
Cabral y Báez was born to President Marcos Antonio Cabral and Altagracia Amelia Báez (daughter of President Buenaventura Báez); he had 7 siblings, among them, Mario Fermín Cabral y Báez. On 17 November 1897, he married María Petronila Bermúdez y Rochet, daughter of Erasmo Bermúdez Jiménez, the founder of Bermúdez rum company; they had 6 children: Amelia María (1899–1996), Auristela (1901–1988), José María (1902–1984), Marco Antonio (1906–1973), Josefina Eugenia (1910–1994), and Pedro Pablo Cabral Bermúdez (1916–1988). He also begat 3 children with Estela Navarro: Mairení, José and Raúl Cabral Navarro; with Rafaela Meyreles he sired 2 children: Rafael and Enrique Meyreles.

Career
In 1886, he founded in Santiago the law firm J. M. Cabral y Báez. He was Minister of Foreign Affairs from July 1908 to November 1911, during the last half of Ramón Cáceres’s presidential term, and minister during the short presidency of Francisco Henríquez y Carvajal in 1916, before the American occupation of the Dominican Republic (1916–24).

References

1864 births
1937 deaths
Descendants of Buenaventura Báez
Dominican Republic people of French descent
Dominican Republic people of Galician descent
Dominican Republic politicians
19th-century Dominican Republic lawyers
Presidents of the Chamber of Deputies of the Dominican Republic
Foreign ministers of the Dominican Republic
Government ministers of the Dominican Republic
20th-century Dominican Republic businesspeople
Dominican Republic people of Canarian descent
Dominican Republic people of Portuguese descent
Dominican Republic people of Spanish descent
White Dominicans
Children of national leaders